Heteropsilopus is a genus of flies in the family Dolichopodidae.

Species

 Heteropsilopus adhaerens (Becker, 1922)
 Heteropsilopus araluensis Bickel, 1994
 Heteropsilopus brevicornis (Macquart, 1850)
 Heteropsilopus brindabellensis Bickel, 1994
 Heteropsilopus caelicus (Parent, 1932)
 Heteropsilopus calabyi Bickel, 1994
 Heteropsilopus cingulipes (Walker, 1835)
 Heteropsilopus dilutus (Parent, 1937)
 Heteropsilopus hilaris (Parent, 1941)
 Heteropsilopus indicus (Parent, 1934)
 Heteropsilopus ingenuus (Erichson, 1842)
 Heteropsilopus intermedius Bickel, 1994
 Heteropsilopus khooi Bickel, 1994
 Heteropsilopus meensis Bickel, 1994
 Heteropsilopus persuadens (Becker, 1922)
 Heteropsilopus plumifer (Becker, 1922)
 Heteropsilopus poecilus (Becker, 1922)
 Heteropsilopus protarsatus (Parent, 1937)
 Heteropsilopus protervus (Parent, 1941)
 Heteropsilopus pulcherrimus (Becker, 1922)
 Heteropsilopus savicensis Bickel, 1994
 Heteropsilopus sigmatinervis (Parent, 1937)
 Heteropsilopus squamifer Hardy, 1958
 Heteropsilopus stragulus (Becker, 1922)
 Heteropsilopus sugdeni Bickel, 1994
 Heteropsilopus tantanoola Bickel, 1994
 Heteropsilopus trifasciatus (Macquart, 1850)
 Heteropsilopus triligatus (Becker, 1922)
 Heteropsilopus tweedensis Bickel, 1994
 Heteropsilopus vanus (Parent, 1941)
 Heteropsilopus yunnanensis Liu, Zhu & Yang, 2012

References 

Dolichopodidae genera
Sciapodinae
Taxa named by Jacques-Marie-Frangile Bigot
Diptera of Australasia
Diptera of Asia